Raduga-1M is a decommissioned orbital military communications satellite built by Roscosmos as part of the  program. It has a launch mass of 2300 kilograms, and was first launched on September 12, 2007, on the Proton launch system. The satellite was later launched two more times as Globus-M12 and Globus M-13 from 2010 to 2013. It was decommissioned in 2013 when they did not need to make any more communication satellites. It consists of two deploy-able power arrays, as well as a battery pack.

References 

Spacecraft launched in 2007
Communications satellites in geostationary orbit
Military satellites of Russia